Foreign Intrigue is a 1956 American Eastmancolor film noir crime film starring Robert Mitchum. The film is written, produced and directed by Sheldon Reynolds, who had produced a television series called Foreign Intrigue in 1951.

Foreign Intrigue was one of the first major Hollywood films to be based on a popular TV series.

Plot
Millionaire Victor Danemore, living on the French Riviera, dies suddenly of a heart attack. His secretary, Dave Bishop (Robert Mitchum), wants to know more about his employer's life. Surprisingly, not even his young wife knows anything about her husband's background or how he earned his fortune. Bishop enters into a world of espionage and blackmail while uncovering Danemore's secret past. Clues lead Bishop to Vienna and Stockholm, where he learns that Danemore was blackmailing people who cooperated with the Nazis during World War II.

Cast
 Robert Mitchum as Dave Bishop
 Geneviève Page as Dominique Danemore
 Ingrid Thulin as Brita Lindquist
 Frédéric O'Brady as Jonathan Spring
 Eugene Deckers as Pierre Sandoz
 Inga Tidblad as Mrs. Lindquist
 Lauritz Falk as Jones
 Frederick Schrecker as Karl Mannheim
 Georges Hubert as Dr. Thibault
 Peter Copley as Brown
 Lily Kann as Blind Housekeeper
 Ralph Brown as Smith
 Milo Sperber as Sergeant Baum
 Jim Gérald as Cafe Owner
 Jean Galland as Victor Danemore

See also
List of American films of 1956

References

External links
 
 
 

1956 films
1950s mystery films
1950s spy films
American mystery films
American spy films
Films directed by Sheldon Reynolds
Color film noir
United Artists films
Cold War spy films
Films based on television series
Films set in France
Films set on the French Riviera
Films set in Stockholm
Films set in Vienna
Films shot in Sweden
Films shot in Monaco
Films shot in Paris
1950s English-language films
1950s American films